The 1952 Japan Series was the Nippon Professional Baseball (NPB) championship series for the 1952 season. It was the third Japan Series and featured the Pacific League champions, the Nankai Hawks, against the Central League champions, the Yomiuri Giants.

Summary

Matchups

Game 1
Saturday, October 11, 1952 – 2:08 pm at Korakuen Stadium in Bunkyō, Tokyo

Game 2
Sunday, October 12, 1952 – 2:01 pm at Korakuen Stadium in Bunkyō, Tokyo

Game 3
Tuesday, October 14, 1952 – 2:03 pm at Osaka Stadium in Osaka, Osaka Prefecture

Game 4
Wednesday, October 15, 1952 – 2:01 pm at Osaka Stadium in Osaka, Osaka Prefecture

Game 5
Thursday, October 16, 1952 – 2:02 pm at Osaka Stadium in Osaka, Osaka Prefecture

Game 6
Saturday, October 18, 1952 – 1:59 pm at Korakuen Stadium in Bunkyō, Tokyo

See also
1952 World Series

References

Japan Series
Japan Series
Japan Series
Japan series